Newtown is a community within the parish of Santon, Isle of Man.  To the northern part of the community lies Mount Murray and to the north-west the Broogh Fort - an Iron Age fort dating from the 13th century.

Villages in the Isle of Man